The Huron Mountain Club is a private club whose land holdings in Marquette County, in the Upper Peninsula of Michigan, constitute one of the largest tracts of primeval forest in the Great Lakes region. The club was founded to establish a remote hunting and fishing club for outdoor enthusiasts. The original charter limited membership to 50 partners.

Through its long association with the non-profit Huron Mountain Wildlife Foundation, the Huron Mountain Club has been the site of a wide range of research in field biology and geology. Naturalist Aldo Leopold produced a plan for preserving the tract in 1938.  The research facility at Ives Lake was started in the 1960s, after it passed from a member family's hands into Club ownership.

Notes

References

External links
Yellow Dog Watershed
Huron Mountain Wildlife Foundation
Moon Travel Guide discussion of Huron Mountain Club
M-35: The Highway Henry Ford Stopped at Michigan Highways
Clubs and societies in the United States
Protected areas of Marquette County, Michigan
Nature reserves in Michigan